Dieter Michalek is a male former international table tennis player from Germany.

He won a bronze medal at the 1963 World Table Tennis Championships in the Swaythling Cup (men's team event) with Ernst Gomolla, Erich Arndt, Eberhard Schöler and Elmar Stegmann.

He also won a medal at the European Table Tennis Championships.

See also
 List of table tennis players
 List of World Table Tennis Championships medalists

References

German male table tennis players
1937 births
Living people
World Table Tennis Championships medalists